Joseph Coyle (born 24 June 1957 in Glasgow) is a Scottish former professional football midfielder. His brothers Tommy and Owen also played professionally.

Coyle began his career with non-league Shettleston before signing for Dumbarton in 1977. He remained at Dumbarton until 1982 before moving to Airdrieonians in 1982. However, he soon returned to Boghead Park and was with the Sons for their only season in the Scottish Premier Division. He subsequently played in the Scottish Football League for Greenock Morton, Arbroath and Stranraer before ending his career with non-league Vale of Leven.

In the early 21st century, Coyle was involved in the management of amateur clubs in the Greater Glasgow area, including Orchard Parkmount and Muirend.

References

1957 births
Living people
Scottish footballers
Scottish people of Irish descent
Glasgow United F.C. players
Dumbarton F.C. players
Scottish Junior Football Association players
Scottish Football League players
Airdrieonians F.C. (1878) players
Greenock Morton F.C. players
Arbroath F.C. players
Stranraer F.C. players
Vale of Leven F.C. players
Footballers from Glasgow
Association football midfielders